BXJ may refer to:

 BXJ instruction, an instruction used in Jazelle to branch to Java
 BXJ Technologies, a fictional organization in the television series 24
 BXJ, IATA code for Boraldai Airport in Almaty city, Kazakhstan
 BXJ, ICAO code for Brixtel Group, an American company